William Haines (6 April 1831 – 11 June 1902) was a South Australian politician affectionately known as the "King of Tea Tree Gully".

History
William Haines was born in Trowbridge, Wiltshire, England, and migrated to South Australia with his parents William Haines snr. (c. 1811 – 6 November 1863) and Jane Haines (née Cook) (1804 – 11 January 1862) and five younger siblings on the William Mitchell, arriving on 27 August 1840.

Their first accommodation was in "Emigration Square" (later to become the Hindmarsh police barracks) then in a settlement on North Terrace near Holy Trinity Church. His father found employment at the Government House vegetable garden, then became head gardener at the Botanic Gardens.

Around 1853 the family moved to Tea Tree Gully, where they set up a market garden. William was granted the license for the Highercombe Hotel adjacent to the family cottage. 
He was a popular host and successful publican, but shortly after the death of his wife Mary, transferred the license to his brother Ephraim. 
Two cottages and the orchard were disposed of. 
The hotel closed in 1878 and was bought by the Government the following year.

On 6 April 1878 Haines stood successfully for the seat of Gumeracha in the House of Assembly, and held it until 7 April 1884 when he was defeated, perhaps on account of a road ("Haines's Folly") from Tea Tree Gully to Anstey's Hill which he advocated.

Haines was clerk of the Teatree Gully District Council for 37 years, an active member of the Royal Agricultural and Horticultural Society for 40 years, and was a member of the school board and the Central Board of Health.

Family
Among William's brothers and sisters were:
(Samuel) Ephraim Haines (c. 1835 – 27 July 1912) married Mary Ann Harmer (c. 1839 – 10 November 1914) on 28 May 1855
Sarah Haines (c. 1832 – 21 November 1877) married William Trethowan Tregeagle (6 December 1834 – 18 June 1905) on 28 May 1855
Maria Haines (c. 1834 – 31 May 1862) married William Harmer (9 February 1834 – 9 February 1901)
Mary Ann Haines (28 Sep 1843 – 15 Jul 1931) married John Harmer (c. 1840 – 12 August 1914) on 13 October 1859

He married three times: (1) Mary Tozer (c. 1823 – 27 April 1876) on 11 December 1852 (2) Margaret Roger McKinley née Cleland (c. 1807 – 9 January 1888) on 5 July 1876  and (3) Ellen Atterton (c. 1847 – 9 May 1928) on 15 March 1890.
Only surviving son Walter Haines (19 February 1864 – c. 15 November 1932) married Anna Horsford (7 August 1864 – c. 12 June 1940) on 9 November 1885

See also
Hundred of Haines

References 

1831 births
1902 deaths
Members of the South Australian House of Assembly
Settlers of South Australia
People from Trowbridge
English emigrants to Australia
19th-century Australian politicians